Orange High School is a high school in the northern area of Orange County, North Carolina.

Students and faculty 
Founded in 1963, Orange High School educates over 1000 students in the northern half of Orange County–generally, the northern half of Hillsborough and all of the county north of I-85. It was the district's sole high school until Cedar Ridge High School opened in 2002 and the OCS Online Academy opened in 2021.

Like most high schools, Orange High serves grades 9 through 12 offering academic, co-curricular, career and technical, and extracurricular opportunities.

The faculty for the North Carolina school includes 79 licensed classroom teachers, four school counselors, 15 support & office staff, two associate principals, one principal, and 13 teachers for exceptional children. Nine of the teachers National Board Certified Teachers, and over 50 percent of staff hold master's degrees.

In Spring of 2007, it was announced that Jeff Dishmon would not be returning as principal of Orange High for the 2007–2008 school year, where he would be moved to a Central Office position.  Roy Winslow became principal, until January 2010 when it was announced that he would be moving to a school in Granville County. Stephen Scroggs, a former Chapel Hill-Carrboro City Schools Assistant Superintendent, was assigned the position of interim principal until a new principal was found. One of the assistant principals, Armond Hankins, was selected for the position, effective July 1, 2010. Hankins was demoted in 2012, and former Gravelly Hill Middle School principal Jason Johnson replaced him.

Athletics 

The Cross Country team has made it to state championships with both girls and boys for six consecutive years, starting in 2006.

In 2005 the wrestling team won the 3A state title. Orange won back to back state championships, winning both the Dual Meet and Individual titles in 2008 and 2009. Orange has won six individual state champions. The team won the duel-team state championships in 2011 and 2012.

The baseball team finished the 2008 season as 2A state champions with a record of 27–3.

2006 school shooting 

On August 30, 2006, former student 18-year-old Alvaro Rafael Castillo murdered his father, Rafael Castillo, and then drove the family minivan to Orange High School, where he set off a cherry bomb and then opened fire with a 9mm Hi-Point 995 Carbine and a sawed-off 12-gauge Mossberg 500 pump-action shotgun. When his carbine jammed he was apprehended by a deputy sheriff assigned to the school and a retired highway patrol officer who taught driver's education. Two students were injured in the attack, but none were killed.

Later that day it was discovered that Castillo had killed his father to "put him out of his misery." When Alvaro Castillo was arrested in the parking lot of Orange High School, he wore a t-shirt with the phrase, "Remember Columbine". He also made the statement "Columbine, remember Columbine," while entering a patrol car, referring to the attack at Columbine High School in Colorado in 1999, which he was obsessed with. He sent a written letter and videotape to the Chapel Hill News prior to the shooting, that made reference to school shootings. He also sent an e-mail to the principal of Columbine High School saying "Dear Principal, In a few hours you will probably hear about a school shooting in North Carolina. I am responsible for it. I remember Columbine. It is time the world remembered it. I am sorry. Goodbye." The carbine he used was the same type used by Columbine shooter Eric Harris.

Castillo entered a plea of not guilty by reason of insanity. Psychologist James Hilkey testified that Castillo suffered from schizotypal and obsessive-compulsive personality disorder, as well as major depressive disorder and was not in touch with reality at the time of the shooting. On August 21, 2009, Castillo was found guilty in Orange County Superior Court following a trial that lasted three weeks. He was sentenced to life in prison with no chance of parole.

Notable alumni 
 Alvis Whitted, former NFL wide receiver and current coach
 Bryse Wilson, MLB pitcher
 Kizzmekia Corbett, Senior Research Fellow and Scientific Lead on the Coronavirus Vaccines & Immunopathogenesis Team at the National Institutes of Health
 Ricardo Marsh, professional basketball player, 2007 top scorer in the Israel Basketball Premier League
 Hilda Pinnix-Ragland, business executive and philanthropist
 Scott Satterfield, college football head coach

References 

Schools in Orange County, North Carolina
Public high schools in North Carolina
1963 establishments in North Carolina
Educational institutions established in 1963